Margarita García Flores (Monterrey, Nuevo León, 4 July 1922 – Mexico City, 10 September 2009) was a Mexican lawyer, activist, writer and politician; she was also involved in women's suffrage. García cofounded Fem magazine with Alaíde Foppa in 1976; it was the first Latin American feminist magazine. She served as director of Universitarios and Prensa, as well as the publications of National Autonomous University of Mexico. García was also a delegate from Cuajimalpa (1976–80), deputy for III Distrito Electoral Federal de Nuevo León (1973–76), and a deputy for Distrito IV de Nuevo León (1955–58).

Selected works
Estudio sobre la situación social, económica y jurídica de la mujer que trabaja en México, 1945
La seguridad social y el bienestar humano, 1965
La igualdad jurídica, 1975
La política en México vista por seis mujeres, coauthored, 1982
Fray Servando y el federalismo mexicano, 1982
La igualdad jurídica, 1985
La seguridad social y la población marginada en México, 1989

References

Bibliography

1922 births
2009 deaths
Writers from Monterrey
Politicians from Monterrey
20th-century Mexican lawyers
Mexican activists
Mexican women activists
20th-century Mexican writers
20th-century Mexican women writers
Mexican women lawyers
20th-century women lawyers
Media founders
Women founders